Thomas William Elliott (6 April 1890 – 4 May 1955) was an English professional footballer who made over 200 appearances as a forward in the Football League for Huddersfield Town, Brentford, Nottingham Forest, Durham City, Crewe Alexandra and Gainsborough Trinity. Either side of his League career, he played in non-League football.

Personal life 
Elliott was deaf.

Career statistics

References

English footballers
People from Annfield Plain
Footballers from County Durham
Association football inside forwards
Annfield Plain F.C. players
West Stanley F.C. players
Gainsborough Trinity F.C. players
Huddersfield Town A.F.C. players
Grimsby Town F.C. players
Nottingham Forest F.C. players
Brentford F.C. players
Durham City A.F.C. players
Crewe Alexandra F.C. players
Crawcrook Albion F.C. players
English Football League players
Deaf association football players
English deaf people
1890 births
1955 deaths

Wallsend F.C. players